Jacek Bogucki (born 13 February 1959 in Wysokie Mazowieckie) is a Polish politician. He was elected to the Sejm on 25 September 2005 with 7,189 votes in 24 Białystok district as a candidate from the Law and Justice list.

In 2007, he was reelected, almost doubling his support with 13,236 votes.

On 4 November 2011 he, along with 15 other supporters of the dismissed PiS MEP Zbigniew Ziobro, left Law and Justice on ideological grounds to form a breakaway group, United Poland.

See also
Members of Polish Sejm 2005-2007
Members of Polish Sejm 2007-2011

References

External links
Jacek Bogucki - parliamentary page - includes declarations of interest, voting record, and transcripts of speeches.
 Jacek Bogucki - Official Website

1959 births
Living people
People from Wysokie Mazowieckie
United Poland politicians
Members of the Polish Sejm 2005–2007
Members of the Polish Sejm 2007–2011
Members of the Polish Sejm 2011–2015
Members of the Polish Sejm 2015–2019
Members of the Senate of Poland 2019–2023